Alma Allen (born June 17, 1970 in Salt Lake City, Utah) is an American sculptor. He lived and worked in Joshua Tree, California. He currently works in Tepotzlán, Mexico.

Work 
Carved from foraged wood and stone or cast in bronze, Allen's sculptures range in scale from thimble-sized fetishes to several ton pseudo-figures.  Though made of the densest materials, the highly polished works appear to be in states of silent, inchoate movement.  The New York Times described the shapes as "sensuous biomorphic forms", and 2014 Whitney Biennial co-curator Michelle Grabner selected three of Allen's large-scale sculptures for inclusion in the 2014 Biennial.

Career and critical reception
Prior to the 2014 Biennial, the self-taught artist was known to a following of collectors, but less so to the wider art establishment. He rarely exhibited, preferring to sell independently from his Mojave Desert studio, which the artist designed and built himself.  The remote location of his studio, one hundred miles from Los Angeles on the edge of the Joshua Tree National Park, led to a reputation as a recluse.

Biennial literature, however, sourced originality in a practice which developed "independently of any recognized art movement" and cited its "impeccable sense of material and form" as the reason for Allen's unlikely discovery by the art world.

Though press accounts had previously taken notice of Allen's painstaking forms, modernist furniture in the tradition of Isamu Noguchi and Donald Judd, images of Allen's Biennial contributions circulated widely in mainstream art-specialized media following the exhibition. Time magazine named his white marble Untitled, 2013, one of the "Five Best Works at the Whitney Biennial", and writing for T: The New York Times Style Magazine, the director Matt Tyrnauer profiled the artist's "road less traveled to art world stardom." Writing in Artforum, critic Andrew Berardini referred to the "gravitational force" of the works in a solo exhibition of Allen's work at Blum & Poe gallery. Allen "interrogates his own place in the vacuum of art history in the only way he knows: by manipulating the nature of materials, a knotty, manifest language of the world", wrote critic Christina Catherine Martinez.

References

External links
 Blum & Poe website
Kasmin Gallery website
Shane Campbell Gallery website

Living people
People from Joshua Tree, California
21st-century American sculptors
American woodcarvers
1970 births
Sculptors from California
Sculptors from Utah
American expatriates in Mexico